Fix of Love is a song written and produced by Vanda & Young and performed by New Zealand singer songwriter, Mark Williams. Released in August 1990 as the second from his fifth studio album Mark Williams ZNZ (1990).

Track listings
 7" Single (Albert Productions 65623)
 "Fix of Love" – 3:44	
 "Your Love" – 3:52

 12" Single / CD Maxi
 "Fix of Love"  (The Big Fix) – 6:51
 "Fix of Love"  (It's a Fix) – 3:47
 "Fix of Love"  (Small Fix Mix)	 – 3:50

Charts

References

1990 singles
Mark Williams (singer) songs
New Zealand pop songs
Songs written by George Young (rock musician)
Songs written by Harry Vanda
Song recordings produced by George Young (rock musician)
Song recordings produced by Harry Vanda
Albert Productions singles
1990 songs